Tommanggong Airport  is an airport in Tommanggong in Kinabatangan District, Sabah, Malaysia. The airport permits landings on runway 11 only and departures on 29. Airport may no longer be in operation.

Airlines and destinations

FlyAsianXpress used to fly to Tommanggong Airport from Sandakan Airport. When MASwings took over the operation, they ended the Sandakan-Tommanggong route and hence there is no scheduled commercial airlines currently flying to the airport. There are no plans to restart the air service between Sandakan and Tomanggong as the current method of access would be via estate gravel road belonging to Hap Seng Plantation Holdings Berhad, under their Tomanggong Group of Estates. This airport is accessible via roads leading to Tagas Estate and Litang Estate from Sungai Segama Group of Estates via a ferry crossing.

See also

 List of airports in Malaysia

References

External links

Airports in Sabah
Kinabatangan District